In the run up to the 2011 Spanish general election, various organisations carried out opinion polling to gauge voting intention in autonomous communities and constituencies in Spain during the term of the 9th Cortes Generales. Results of such polls are displayed in this article. The date range for these opinion polls is from the previous general election, held on 9 March 2008, to the day the next election was held, on 20 November 2011.

Voting intention estimates refer mainly to a hypothetical Congress of Deputies election. Polls are listed in reverse chronological order, showing the most recent first and using the dates when the survey fieldwork was done, as opposed to the date of publication. Where the fieldwork dates are unknown, the date of publication is given instead. The highest percentage figure in each polling survey is displayed with its background shaded in the leading party's colour. If a tie ensues, this is applied to the figures with the highest percentages. The "Lead" columns on the right shows the percentage-point difference between the parties with the highest percentages in a given poll.

Refusals are generally excluded from the party vote percentages, while question wording and the treatment of "don't know" responses and those not intending to vote may vary between polling organisations. When available, seat projections are displayed below the percentages in a smaller font.

Autonomous communities

Andalusia

Aragon

Asturias

Balearic Islands

Basque Country

Canary Islands

Cantabria

Castile and León

Castilla–La Mancha

Catalonia

Extremadura

Galicia

La Rioja

Madrid

Murcia

Navarre

Valencian Community

Constituencies

A Coruña

Álava

Albacete

Alicante

Almería

Asturias

Badajoz

Balearic Islands

Barcelona

Biscay

Cáceres

Cádiz

Cantabria

Castellón

Ciudad Real

Córdoba

Cuenca

Gipuzkoa

Girona

Granada

Guadalajara

Huelva

Jaén

La Rioja

Lleida

Lugo

Madrid

Málaga

Murcia

Navarre

Ourense

Pontevedra

Tarragona

Seville

Valencia

See also
Opinion polling for the 2011 Spanish general election

Notes

References

2011 elections in Spain
Opinion polling for the 2011 Spanish general election